Four Powers may refer to:

 Allied Control Council, also referred to as the Four Powers, usually refers to the four countries that occupied the defeated Germany and Austria after the end of the Second World War in 1945 - France, the United Kingdom, the United States and the Soviet Union
 Four Policemen, also called the Four Powers during the war, was the four major Allies powers of World War II: China, Soviet Union, the United Kingdom and the United States